Park Young-sun (born 22 January 1960) is a South Korean journalist-turned politician previously served as the second Minister of SMEs and Startups under President Moon Jae-in from April 2019 to 2021 and the first woman to lead SME-specialised government entity since its creation in 1996. Park is also a four-term parliamentarian of Democratic Party.

Early career 
After finishing her undergraduate studies, Park began her career in journalism at MBC. She first joined the organisation as an announcer but was shortly transferred to its newsroom. From early 1980s to the early 2000s, Park hosted various television news programmes apart from few years when she was stationed in Los Angeles as its correspondent. From 2003 Park led its Economy News Department before leaving the company in 2004.

Parliamentarian 
As a parliamentarian Park holds two titles of being the first woman - to lead the main opposition party as its floor leader and to chair the Legislation and Judiciary Committee at the National Assembly where all bills are reviewed before being introduced to the floor. Park is most known to the public as a parliamentarian for her work on reforming the judiciary system in the country, promoting its "fair economy" and uncovering misdemeanors of Lee Myung-bak administration.

Park first entered politics in 2004 for the general election. She was recruited by Chung Dong-young who was the leader of Uri Party and a fellow ex-MBC reporter. She was elected through proportional representation for which she was on number 9 on her party's list. In the following elections, Park successfully ran for Seoul's Guro B constituency where many SMEs and startups reside.

Park served as a chair of the 19th National Assembly's Legislation and Judiciary Committee and of the party's Special Committee on chaebol reform. She was one of the vocal critics of South Korea's biggest chaebol, Samsung Group, and was particularly noted for her position on a controversial SDS transaction and the profits accumulated from a 1999 deal ruled by the courts as illegal. She played a leading role in passing bills related to economic democratization while serving as a chair of the Legislation and Judiciary Committee in 2013.

From May to October 2014, she served as the floor leader of New Politics Alliance for Democracy . She is the first female politician who was elected a floor leader of a major opposition party in Korea. After Ahn Hee-jung lost party primary to then-candidate Moon Jae-in, she then joined Moon's second presidential campaign in 2017 South Korean presidential election.

In 2011 Park earned the party nomination for Seoul Mayor emptied by Oh Se-hoon but later withdrew her candidacy after their agreed poll found Park Won-soon, then independent candidate, more fit to win the election and defeat Na Kyung-won. In 2018 Park ran for the same post again but lost to Park Won-soon in her party's primary.

Cabinet minister 
In March 2019, she was appointed the Minister of SMEs and Startups. Poll in December 2020 shows that over 70% of mid-to-low ranking officer at her Ministry surveyed would like to continue to work with Park as she is poised to run for Seoul Mayor bielection in 2021.

She was also the first South Korean minister to serve in the Stewardship Board at a Davos Forum Platform.

2021 Seoul mayoral election 

In January 2021, after a week after resigning from the SME minister, Park announced her candidacy for Seoul Mayor in the upcoming 2021 by-elections. Her former colleague at Moon's administration, former ministers Park Yang-woo, Cho Myung-rae, Jeong Kyeong-doo and Kang Kyung-wha, joined her campaign as advisors.

On 1 March 2021, Park earned party nomination for Seoul Mayor receiving nearly 70% of the votes cast, defeating the 4-term MP Woo Sang-ho. This makes Park the third woman the democratic party has nominated for Seoul Mayor post after the former Justice Minister Kang Kum-sil and the former Prime Minister Han Myeong-sook. Park was the front-runner to run against Oh Se-hoon from the main opposition party or Ahn Cheol-soo a former Seoul mayor candidate and a former presidential hopeful in the April by-election.

On 7 March, Park was confirmed as the unity candidate of the Democratic Party and the Transition Korea, defeating Cho Jung-hun.

Education and Academia 
Park holds two degrees - a bachelor in geography from Kyung Hee University and a master's in journalism from Sogang University. She also taught journalism in practice classes as an adjunct professor at her first alma mater from 2000 to 2002.

References

External links
Official website 

|-

|-

Members of the National Assembly (South Korea)
Minjoo Party of Korea politicians
South Korean journalists
South Korean women journalists
Kyung Hee University alumni
Sogang University alumni
People from Changnyeong County
1960 births
Living people
Women government ministers of South Korea
Female members of the National Assembly (South Korea)